Xyletomerus is a genus of death-watch and spider beetles in the family Ptinidae. There are at least two described species in Xyletomerus.

Species
These two species belong to the genus Xyletomerus:
 Xyletomerus arbuti (Fisher, 1919) i c g
 Xyletomerus histricus Fall, 1905 i c g b
Data sources: i = ITIS, c = Catalogue of Life, g = GBIF, b = Bugguide.net

References

Ptinidae